National Naval Officers Association (NNOA) is a support organization of the United States Navy, United States Marine Corps and the United States Coast Guard.

NNOA is composed of active duty, Reserve and retired officers, Midshipmen from the United States Naval Academy, the United States Coast Guard Academy and Naval Reserve Officer Training Corps (NROTC) units, and interested civilians.

NNOA is sanctioned by the Secretary of the Navy and the Secretary of Homeland Security and is a member of the Navy and Marine Corps Council.

History
LT Kenneth H. Johnson, while serving as Advisor for Minority Affairs at the United States Naval Academy in 1970, sought methods to improve minority interest in recruitment efforts and participation in the Naval Academy's Blue and Gold Program. In 1971, faced with finding qualified naval officer candidates from minority communities, CAPT Emerson Emory, CAPT Claude Williams, CDR Emmanuel Jenkins, CWO James Harris and LT Johnson began to discuss forming an organization to assist minority officer recruitment. An organizational meeting was held at the Hilton Inn in Annapolis, Maryland in 1972 and NNOA was founded. CAPT Emerson Emory was elected the first president of NNOA.

The first chartered chapter was the Annapolis, Maryland chapter.

Annual conference

The National Naval Officers Association's National Conference, held annually during July, includes many hours of educational and professional development workshops, seminars, and exhibits designed to enhance the professional knowledge of attendees while increasing overall awareness of issues affecting the sea service.

The first annual meeting was held in San Diego, California in 1973.

External links 
nnoa.org National Naval Officers Association Official Site

United States military support organizations
United States Navy support organizations
Non-profit organizations based in Alexandria, Virginia